Huey Percy Newton (February 17, 1942 – August 22, 1989) was an African-American revolutionary and political activist. Newton was most notable for being a co-founder of the Black Panther Party where he operated the organization as the de facto leader. Newton crafted the Party's ten-point manifesto with Bobby Seale in 1966.

Under Newton's leadership, the Black Panther Party founded over 60 community support programs (renamed survival programs in 1971) including food banks, medical clinics, sickle cell anemia tests, prison busing for families of inmates, legal advice seminars, clothing banks, housing cooperatives, and their own ambulance service. The most famous of these programs was the Free Breakfast for Children program which fed thousands of impoverished children daily during the early 1970s. Newton also co-founded the Black Panther newspaper service, which became one of America's most widely distributed African-American newspapers.

In 1967, he was involved in a shootout which led to the death of police officer John Frey and injuries to himself and another police officer. In 1968, he was convicted of voluntary manslaughter for Frey's death and sentenced to 2 to 15 years in prison. In May 1970, the conviction was reversed and after two subsequent trials ended in hung juries, the charges were dropped. Later in life, he was also accused of murdering Kathleen Smith and Betty Patter, although he was never convicted for either death.

Newton learned to read using  Plato's Republic, which influenced his philosophy of activism. He went on to earn a PhD in social philosophy from the University of California at Santa Cruz's History of Consciousness program in 1980. In 1989, he was murdered in Oakland, California by Tyrone Robinson, a member of the Black Guerrilla Family.

Newton was known for being an advocate of self-defense and used his position as a leader within the Black Panther Party to welcome women and LGBT people into the party, holding the belief that homosexuals "might be the most oppressed people".

Biography

Early life and education

Newton was born in Monroe, Louisiana in 1942 during World War II, the youngest child of Armelia Johnson and Walter Newton, a sharecropper and Baptist preacher. His parents named him after Huey Long, former governor of Louisiana. Monroe is located in Louisiana's Ouachita Parish, which has a history of violence against blacks since Reconstruction. According to a 2015 report by the Equal Justice Initiative, from 1877 to 1950, a total of 37 black people were documented as lynched in that parish. Most murders had taken place around the turn of the 20th century. This was the fifth-highest total of lynchings of any county in the Southern United States.

As a response to the violence, the Newton family migrated to Oakland, California, participating in the second wave of the Great Migration of African-Americans out of the South. The Newton family was close-knit, but quite poor. They moved often within the San Francisco Bay Area during Newton's childhood. Despite this, Newton said he never went without food and shelter as a child. As a teenager, he was arrested several times for criminal offenses, including gun possession and vandalism at age 14. Growing up in Oakland, Newton stated that he was "made to feel ashamed of being black".

In his autobiography Revolutionary Suicide, he wrote:

Newton graduated from Oakland Technical High School in 1959. He attended Merritt College, where he earned an Associate of Arts degree in 1966. Plato's Republic was an influential work in Newton's early adult life; he told the court during the trial for the killing of officer John Frey, that he had learned to read from studying the Republic. After that, he started "questioning everything". In his autobiography, Revolutionary Suicide, he states: "Most of all, I questioned what was happening in my own family and in the community around me."

Newton continued his education, studying at San Francisco Law School, and the University of California at Santa Cruz, where he earned a bachelor's degree. He was a member of Phi Beta Sigma. He later continued his studies and, in 1980, he completed a PhD in social philosophy at Santa Cruz.

Founding of the Black Panther Party

As a student of the Merritt College in Oakland, Newton became involved in Bay Area politics. He joined the Afro-American Association (AAA), became a prominent member of Phi Beta Sigma fraternity's Beta Tau chapter, and played a role in getting the first African-American history course adopted as part of the college's curriculum. Newton learned about black history from Donald Warden (who later would change his name to Khalid Abdullah Tariq Al-Mansour), the leader of the AAA. Later Newton concluded that Warden offered solutions that didn't work. In his autobiography, Newton says of Warden, "The mass media, the oppressors, give him public exposure for only one reason: he will lead the people away from the truth of their situation." In college, Newton read the works of Karl Marx, Vladimir Lenin, Frantz Fanon, Malcolm X, Mao Zedong, Émile Durkheim, and Che Guevara.

During his time at Merritt College, he met Bobby Seale, and the two co-founded the Black Panther Party for Self Defense (BPP) in October 1966. Based on a casual conversation, Seale became chairman and Newton became minister of defense. The Black Panther Party was an African-American left-wing organization advocating for the right of self-defense for black people in the United States. The Black Panther Party's beliefs were greatly influenced by Malcolm X. Newton stated: "Therefore, the words on this page cannot convey the effect that Malcolm has had on the Black Panther Party, although, as far as I am concerned, the Party is a living testament to his life work." The party achieved national and international renown through their deep involvement in the Black Power movement and the politics of the 1960s and 1970s.

The party's political goals, including better housing, jobs, and education for African-Americans, were documented in their Ten-Point Program, a set of guidelines to the Black Panther Party's ideals and ways of operation. The group believed that violenceor the threat of itmight be needed to bring about social change. They sometimes made news with a show of force, as they did when they entered the California Legislature fully armed in order to protest a gun bill aimed at disarming them. Many BPP members were accustomed to violence as they were from families that had left the South, where lynchings against blacks had caused thousands of deaths.

Newton adopted what he termed "revolutionary humanism". Although he had previously attended Nation of Islam mosques, he wrote that "I have had enough of religion and could not bring myself to adopt another one. I needed a more concrete understanding of social conditions. References to God or Allah did not satisfy my stubborn thirst for answers." Later, however, he stated that "As far as I am concerned, when all of the questions are not answered, when the extraordinary is not explained, when the unknown is not known, then there is room for God because the unexplained and the unknown is God." Newton later decided to join a Christian church after the party disbanded during his marriage to Fredrika.

Newton would frequent pool halls, campuses, bars and other locations deep in the black community where people gathered in order to organize and recruit for the Panthers. While recruiting, Newton sought to educate those around him about the legality of self-defense. One of the reasons, he argued, why black people continued to be persecuted was their lack of knowledge of the social institutions that could be made to work in their favor. In Newton's autobiography, Revolutionary Suicide, he writes, "Before I took Criminal Evidence in school, I had no idea what my rights were."

Newton also wrote in his autobiography, "I tried to transform many of the so-called criminal activities going on in the street into something political, although this had to be done gradually." He attempted to channel these "daily activities for survival" into significant community actions. Eventually, the illicit activities of a few members would be superimposed on the social program work performed by the Panthers, and this mischaracterization would lose them some support in black communities and white.

Newton and the Panthers started a number of social programs in Oakland, including founding the Oakland Community School, which provided high-level education to 150 children from impoverished urban neighborhoods. Other Panther programs included the Free Breakfast for Children Program and others that offered dances for teenagers and training in martial arts. According to Oakland County Supervisor John George: "Huey could take street-gang types and give them a social consciousness."

In 1982, Newton was accused of embezzling $600,000 of state aid to the Panther-founded Oakland Community School. In the wake of the embezzlement charges, Newton disbanded the Black Panther Party. The embezzlement charges were dropped six years later in March 1989, after Newton pleaded no contest to a single allegation of cashing a $15,000 state check for personal use. He was sentenced to six months in jail and 18 months probation.

Fatal shooting of John Frey
Newton had been convicted of assault with a deadly weapon for repeatedly stabbing another man, Odell Lee, with a steak knife in mid-1964. He served six months in prison. By October 27–28, 1967, he was out celebrating the release from his probationary period. Just before dawn on October 28, Newton and a friend were pulled over by Oakland Police Department officer John Frey. Realizing who Newton was, Frey called for backup. After fellow officer Herbert Heanes arrived, shots were fired, and all three were wounded.

Heanes testified that the shooting began after Newton was under arrest, and one witness testified that Newton shot Frey with Frey's own gun as they wrestled. No gun on either Frey or Newton was found. Newton stated that Frey shot him first, which made him lose consciousness during the incident. Frey was shot four times and died within the hour, while Heanes was left in serious condition with three bullet wounds. Black Panther David Hilliard took Newton to Oakland's Kaiser Hospital, where he was admitted with a bullet wound to the abdomen. Newton was soon handcuffed to his bed and arrested for Frey's killing. A doctor, Thomas Finch, and nurse, Corrine Leonard, attended to Newton when he arrived at the hospital, and Finch stated that Newton was "agitated" when asking for treatment and that Newton was given a tranquilizer to calm him.

Newton was convicted in September 1968 of voluntary manslaughter for the killing of Frey and was sentenced to 2 to 15 years in prison. In May 1970, the California Appellate Court reversed the conviction and ordered a new trial. After two subsequent trials ended in hung juries, the district attorney said he would not pursue a fourth trial, and the Alameda County Superior Court dismissed the charges. In his autobiography, Revolutionary Suicide, Newton wrote that Heanes and Frey were opposite each other and shooting in each other's direction during the shootout.

Hugh Pearson, in his book Shadow of the Panther, writes that Newton, while intoxicated, boasted about having willfully killed Frey. Charles E. Jones, in the introduction to The Black Panther Party (Reconsidered), states that this claim has not been corroborated by others.

"Free Huey!" campaign
Newton was arrested on the day of the shooting on October 28, 1967, and pled not guilty to the murder of officer John Frey. The Black Panther Party immediately went to work organizing a coalition to rally behind Newton and champion his release. In December the Peace and Freedom Party, a majority white anti-war political organization, joined with the Black Panther Party in support of Newton. This alliance served the dual purpose of legitimizing Newton's cause while boosting the credibility of the party within the community of more radical activists.

Under the leadership of the Black Panther Party and the Peace and Freedom Party, 5,000 protesters gathered in Oakland on Newton's birthday, February 17, 1968, in support of Newton. They garnered the attention of international news organizations, raising the profile of the party by astounding measures. The phrase "Free Huey!" was adopted as a rallying cry for the movement, and it was printed on buttons and T-shirts. Prominent Black Panther Kathleen Cleaver claimed the goal of the Free Huey! campaign was to elevate Newton as a symbol of everything the Black Panther Party stood for, creating something of a living martyr. The trial, which began on July 15, quickly ascended beyond the scope of Newton himself, evolving into a racially-charged political movement.  Over the two year course of Newton's original trial and two appeals, the coalition continued to offer its support until the charges were overturned and Newton was released on August 5, 1970.

Visit to China

In 1970, after his release from prison, Newton received an invitation to visit the People's Republic of China. On learning of Nixon's plan to visit China in 1972, Newton decided to visit before him. Newton made the trip in late September 1971 with fellow Panthers, Elaine Brown and Robert Bay, and stayed for 10 days. At every Chinese airport he landed in, Newton was greeted by thousands of people waving copies of the "Little Red Book" (officially titled Quotations from Chairman Mao Tse-tung) and displaying signs that said "we support the Black Panther Party, down with U.S. imperialism" or "we support the American people but the Nixon imperialist regime must be overthrown."

During the trip, the Chinese arranged for him to meet and have dinner with an ambassador from North Korea, an ambassador from Tanzania, and delegations from both North Vietnam and the Provisional Revolutionary Government of South Vietnam. Newton was under the impression he was going to meet Mao Zedong, chairman of the Chinese Communist Party, but instead had two meetings with Chinese premier Zhou Enlai. One of these meetings also included Mao's wife Jiang Qing. Newton described China as "a free and liberated territory with a socialist government".

Following Newton's Asian trip, the Black Panther Party began incorporating North Korea's Juche ideals into the party's ideology.

Peoples Temple of the Disciples of Christ
In January 1977, Jim Jones, leader of the Peoples Temple of the Disciples of Christ (commonly shortened to the Peoples Temple), visited Newton in Havana, Cuba.

That same year after Jones fled to "Jonestown", a commune he established in Guyana for his followers, Newton spoke to Temple members in Jonestown via telephone expressing support for Jones during one of the Temple's earliest "White Nights". Newton's cousin, Stanley Clayton, was one of the few residents of Jonestown to escape the area before the 1978 mass murder of over 900 Temple members by Jones and his enforcers through forced suicide.

Allegations of violence
By the 1970s, Newton had allegedly became increasingly paranoid, addicted to crack cocaine, and prone to violent behavior.

On August 6, 1974, Kathleen Smith, a 17-year-old Oakland native and child prostitute was shot; she died three months later. According to the prosecutor handling the case, Newton is believed to have shot Smith after a casual exchange on the street during which she referred to him as "Baby", a childhood nickname he hated. The main witness of this case refused to testify due to an assassination attempt against her and, after two deadlocked jury trials, Newton was not convicted.

Newton is also alleged to have assaulted his tailor over the price of a suit. Newton posted bond after being arrested for pistol-whipping the tailor in 1974. 

Newton was subsequently arrested a second time for the murder of Smith, but was able to post an additional $80,000 bond, thus securing his release until trial. Newton and his girlfriend (later his wife) Gwen Fontaine then fled to Havana, Cuba, where they lived until 1977, which prevented further prosecution on the two charges. Elaine Brown took over as chairperson of the Black Panther Party in his absence. Newton returned to the United States in 1977 to stand trial for the murder of Smith and the assault on the tailor.

In October 1977, three Black Panthers attempted to assassinate Crystal Gray, a key prosecution witness in Newton's upcoming trial who had been present the day of Kathleen Smith's murder. Unknown to the assailants, they attacked the wrong house and the occupant returned fire. During the shootout one of the Panthers, Louis Johnson, was killed, and the other two assailants escaped. One of the two surviving assassins, Flores Forbes, fled to Las Vegas, Nevada, with the help of Panther paramedic Nelson Malloy. In November 1977, Malloy was found by park rangers paralyzed from the waist down from bullet wounds to the back in a shallow grave in the desert outside of Las Vegas. According to Malloy, he and Forbes were ordered by "higher-ups" to be killed to eliminate any eyewitness accounts of the attempted murder of Crystal Gray. Malloy recovered from the assault and told police that fellow Panthers Rollin Reid and Allen Lewis were behind his attempted murder. Newton denied any involvement or knowledge, and said that the events "might have been the result of overzealous party members". After the assassination attempt on Crystal Gray, she declined to testify against Newton. After two trials and two deadlocked juries, the prosecution decided not to retry Newton for Smith's murder.

During Newton's trial for assaulting the tailor, who changed his testimony several times and eventually told the jury that he did not know who assaulted him. Newton was acquitted of the assault in September 1978, but convicted of illegal firearms possession and served 9 months in prison in 1987.

In 2007, party member Ericka Huggins stated in an interview that Newton repeatedly raped her and threatened that if she told anyone he would hurt her children. Huggins claimed that party members widely believed Newton had been sexually abused by his father. Newton also physically assaulted Huggins, which caused her to leave the Black Panther Party.

Death 
In the early hours of August 22, 1989, Newton was murdered in front of 1456 9th Street, near the corner of Center Street in the Lower Bottoms section of Oakland, California. Within days, Tyrone Robinson was arrested as a suspect; he was on parole and admitted the murder to police, claiming self-though police found no evidence that Newton was carrying a gun. In 1991, Robinson was convicted of first-degree murder and sentenced to a prison term of 32 years to life. Robinson stated that his motive was to advance in the Black Guerrilla Family, a Marxist–Leninist narcotics prison gang, in order to get a crack franchise.

Newton's funeral was held at Allen Temple Baptist Church, where he attended following his conversion. Some 1,300 mourners were accommodated inside, and another 500 to 600 listened to the service from outside. Newton's achievements in civil rights and work on behalf of Black children and families with the Black Panther Party were celebrated. Newton's body was cremated, and his ashes were interred at Evergreen Cemetery in Oakland.

On February 17, 2021, in commemoration of the Black Panther Party the City of Oakland erected a bust of Huey Newton near the corner where he was murdered. That same year, a commemorative plaque "Dr. Huey P. Newton Way" was applied to this section of 9th Street.

Writing and scholarship
Newton received a bachelor's degree from the University of California at Santa Cruz in 1974. In 1978, while in prison, Newton met evolutionary biologist Robert Trivers after Newton applied to do a reading course with Trivers as part of a graduate degree in history of consciousness. He and Trivers became close friends, and they published an analysis of the role of flight crew self-deception in the 1982 crash of Air Florida Flight 90.

Newton earned a PhD in the social philosophy program of History of Consciousness from the University of California at Santa Cruz in 1980. His doctoral dissertation entitled War Against the Panthers: A Study of Repression in America "analyzes certain features of the Party and incidents that are significant in its development", among which are how the United States federal government responded to the BPP as well as to the assassinations of Fred Hampton, Bunchy Carter, and John Huggins. Sources for material used to support the dissertation include two federal civil rights lawsuits. One suit was against the FBI and other government officials, while the other was initially against the City of Chicago.

Later, Newton's widow, Fredrika Newton, would discuss her husband's often-ignored academic research during C-SPAN's American Perspectives program on February 18, 2006.  After the decline of the Black Panther Party, Huey P. Newton completed and copyrighted dozens of essays on philosophy, political theology, evolutionary biology, and political economy which remain unpublished and held in archive at Stanford University.

Works
  – oral history (Paredon Records, 1970)
 , Franz Schurmann (Introduction) (Random House, 1972)
 , with J. Herman Blake (Random House, 1973; republished in 1995 with introduction by Blake)
 , with Ericka Huggins (1975)
 The Crash of Flight 90: Doomed by Self-Deception?, with Robert Trivers (Science Digest, 1982)
  (Harlem River Press, 1996: the published version of Newton's PhD thesis)
 , edited by David Hilliard and Donald Weise (Seven Stories Press)
 Essays from the Minister of Defense, Black Panther Party, 1968, Oakland (pamphlet)
 The Genius of Huey P. Newton, Awesome Records (June 1, 1993)
 The original vision of the Black Panther Party, Black Panther Party (1973)
 Huey Newton talks to the movement about the Black Panther Party, cultural nationalism, SNCC, liberals and white revolutionaries (The Movement, 1968)
 , edited by Toni Morrison, foreword by Elaine Brown (Random House, 1972; City Lights Publishers, 2009)
 , edited by David Hilliard and Donald Weise, introduction by Elaine Brown (Seven Stories Press, 2019)

In popular culture 
 In the song "Changes" by Tupac Shakur, Newton is referenced in the lyrics "It's time to fight back, that's what Huey said. Two shots in the dark, now Huey's although the lyrics were mistaken about the number of times Newton was shot when he was murdered.
 In the song "Propaganda" (2000) by Dead Prez, on their album Let's Get Free, Newton is referenced in the lyrics "31 years ago I would've been a Panther. They killed Huey cause they knew he had the answer. The views that you see in the news is propaganda." As well as in the outro of the song, which samples an interview with Newton:

[Outro: Huey P. Newton]
Uh, we view each other with a great love and a great understanding. And that we try to expand this to the general black population, and also, peopleoppressed people all over the world. And, I think that we differ from some other groups simply because we understand the system better than most groups understand the system. And with this realization, we attempt to form a strong political base based in the community with the only strength that we have and that's the strength of a potentially destructive force if we don't get freedom.
 The song "Up in Arms" (2015) by American songwriter Bhi Bhiman is based on Newton's life.
 Agnès Varda's 1968 documentary on the Black Panthers features extensive interviews with Newton during his incarceration.
 The Boondocks comic strip by Aaron McGruder, and related TV cartoon, features a main character known as Huey Freeman, a 10-year-old African-American revolutionary, who was named after Newton; Freeman starts an independent newspaper, dubbing it the Free Huey World Report.
 The song "Same Thing" (2007) by band Flobots mentions Newton: "Somewhere between prayer and revolution, Between Jesus and Huey P. Newton, That's where you find Jonny 5 shoot shootin', Water guns at the audience while ya scootin'."
 Newton is mentioned in the song "Mortal Man" (2015) by Kendrick Lamar: "How many leaders you said you needed then left ‘em for dead? Is it Moses? Is it Huey Newton or Detroit Red?"
 The fourth track on St. Vincent's 2014 St. Vincent album is named after Newton
 Newton is mentioned in the Ramshackle Glory song "From Here Till Utopia"
 Newton is mentioned in Public Enemy's "Welcome to the Terrordome".
 The song "Free Huey" by the Boo Radleys, from their Kingsize album (1998) is about the activities of the Black Panther Party when Newton was an activist.
 Newton is mentioned in Buddy and A$AP Ferg's "Black".
 Kendrick Lamar also mentioned Newton in the song "HiiiPoWeR" from his debut album Section.80.
 In the 1979 stand-up comedy special Richard Pryor: Live in Concert, Pryor requests the house lights be turned on and points out and introduces Newton in the crowd, and thanks him for his attendance.
 Newton is mentioned/discussed in the 1998 film Bulworth as to "why there are no more black leaders in America?"
 Newton is mentioned by Michael Stivic in the January 15, 1972 episode of All In The Family.  (Season 2 Episode 16).  Archie was being investigated by the federal government.  In the closing scene, Mike told him he was in good company.  He mentioned Newton, Dr. Spock and others.
 A "Huey Newton for Congress" poster is seen hanging on the wall in the third season of the series The Boys.
 Newton is mentioned by Nas on his song "Queens get the money" on his 2008 album Untitled.

See also

 The Black Panthers: Vanguard of the Revolution
 Eldridge Cleaver
 COINTELPRO
 Angela Davis
 George Jackson
 New Left
 Soledad Brothers
 White Panther Party
 Young Lords

References

Further reading
 Foner, Philip S. (editor). The Black Panthers Speak – The Manifesto of the Party: The First Complete Documentary Record of the Panther's Program (Dial, 1970).
 
 Hevesi, Dennis. "Huey Newton Symbolized the Rising Black Anger of a Generation" (obituary), The New York Times, August 23, 1989.
 Brown, Elaine. A Taste of Power (Anchor Books, 1993). .
 Horowitz, David. "Hating Whitey and Other Progressive Causes" Spence Pub, September 1, 1999.
 Hillard, David with Zimmerman, Keith and Kent. Huey: Spirit of the Panther (Thunder's Mouth Press, 2005).

External links

 Online audiorecordings and video of Newton via UC Berkeley Black Panther site
 Newton Discography on Folkways
 Newton's doctoral dissertation "War Against the Panthers" via Internet Archive

1942 births
1989 deaths
1989 murders in the United States
African-American activists
African-American history in Oakland, California
African-American philosophers
American philosophers
Activists for African-American civil rights
American humanists
American revolutionaries
American sociologists
Burials at Evergreen Cemetery (Oakland, California)
COINTELPRO targets
Deaths by firearm in California
Former Nation of Islam members
Members of the Black Panther Party
Murdered African-American people
People murdered by African-American organized crime
Philosophers from California
Philosophers from Louisiana
People from Monroe, Louisiana
People murdered in California
Activists from Oakland, California
University of California, Santa Cruz alumni
San Francisco Law School alumni
Prisoners and detainees of California
African-American communists
African-American Christians
American political party founders
Christian humanists
Left-wing populism in the United States